Hector Sandoval (born July 19, 1986) is Mexican-American mixed martial artist, who competed in the Ultimate Fighting Championship. He currently competes in the flyweight division.

Background
Born in Uruapan, Michoacán, Mexico, Sandoval moved to Ukiah, California as a child. He began training in mixed martial arts in 2006 at the age of 19.

Mixed martial arts career
Sandoval made his professional debut in July 2008. He compiled a record of 12 - 2 on the regional scene in California, including stints for Palace Fighting Championship and Tachi Palace Fights, before signing with the UFC on the heels of a four fight winning streak in June 2016.

Ultimate Fighting Championship
Morales made his promotional debut as a short notice replacement against Wilson Reis on July 30, 2016 at UFC 201. He lost the fight via submission in the first round.

Sandoval faced Fredy Serrano on December 17, 2016 at UFC on Fox 22. He won the fight via unanimous decision.

Sandoval faced Matt Schnell on April 22, 2017 at UFC Fight Night 108. He won via knockout in the first round.

Sandoval faced Dustin Ortiz on August 5, 2017 at UFC Fight Night 114. He lost the fight via knockout in the first round.

Sandoval was scheduled to face Jarred Brooks on June 1, 2018 at UFC Fight Night 131. However, Sandoval was removed from the bout on May 22 for undisclosed reasons and replaced by promotional newcomer Jose Torres.

It was reported in November 2018 that Sandoval was released from UFC.

Post-UFC career
After being released from the UFC, Sandoval next faced Jorge Calvo Martin at Combate 37 on May 10, 2019. Sandoval won the fight via unanimous decision.

Sandoval was expected to face John Moraga at ARES 2 on April 3, 2020. However, due to the COVID-19 pandemic, the event was postponed until October 30, 2020.

Championships and accomplishments
Tachi Palace Fights
TPF Flyweight Championship (One time)

Mixed martial arts record

|-
|Win
|align=center|15–4
|Jorge Calvo Martin
|Decision (unanimous)
|Combate 36: Sanchez vs. Velasco
|
|align=center|3
|align=center|5:00
|Stockton, California, United States
|
|-
|Loss
|align=center|14–4
|Dustin Ortiz
|KO (punches)
|UFC Fight Night: Pettis vs. Moreno
|
|align=center|1
|align=center|0:15
|Mexico City, Mexico
|
|-
|Win
|align=center|14–3
|Matt Schnell
|KO (punches)
|UFC Fight Night: Swanson vs. Lobov
|
|align=center|1
|align=center|4:24
|Nashville, Tennessee, United States
|
|-
|Win
|align=center|13–3 
|Fredy Serrano
|Decision (unanimous)
|UFC on Fox: VanZant vs. Waterson
|
|align=center|3
|align=center|5:00
|Sacramento, California, United States
|
|-
|Loss
|align=center|12–3
|Wilson Reis
|Submission (rear-naked choke)
|UFC 201
|
|align=center|1
|align=center|1:49
|Atlanta, Georgia, United States
|
|-
|Win
|align=center| 12–2
|Eloy Garza
|TKO (punches)
|Global Knockout 6
|
|align=center| 1
|align=center| 3:19
|Jackson, California, United States
|
|-
|Win
|align=center| 11–2
|Martin Sandoval
|Decision (unanimous)
|TPF 26: Brawl in the Hall
|
|align=center| 3
|align=center| 5:00
|Lemoore, California, United States
|
|-
|Win
|align=center| 10–2
|Derrick Easterling
|Decision (unanimous)
|Conquer Fighting Championships
|
|align=center|3
|align=center|5:00
|Richmond, California, United States
|
|-
|Win
|align=center| 9–2
|Oscar Ramirez
|TKO (punches)
|West Coast FC 13
|
|align=center|2
|align=center|0:41
|Sacramento, California, United States
|
|-
|Loss
|align=center| 8–2
|Willie Gates
|TKO (punches)
|TPF 21: All or Nothing
|
|align=center|1
|align=center|1:23
|Lemoore, California, United States
|
|-
|Win
|align=center| 8–1
|Ryan Hollis
|Decision (unanimous)
|TPF 20: Night of Champions
|
|align=center|5
|align=center|5:00
|Lemoore, California, United States
|
|-
|Win
|align=center| 7–1
|Benjamin Vinson
|Decision (unanimous)
|TPF 18: Martinez vs. Culley
|
|align=center|3
|align=center|5:00
|Lemoore, California, United States
|
|-
|Win
|align=center| 6–1
|Robert Schepps
|Decision (unanimous)
|Rogue Fights 22
|
|align=center|3
|align=center|5:00
|Redding, California, United States
|
|-
|Win
|align=center| 5–1
|Andrew Vallarerez
|Submission (guillotine choke)
|Dragon House 13
|
|align=center|1
|align=center|0:50
|Oakland, California, United States
|
|-
|Win
|align=center| 4–1
|Taylor McCorriston
|Decision (unanimous)
|Impact MMA - Recognition
|
|align=center|3
|align=center|5:00
|Pleasanton, California, United States
|
|-
|Win
|align=center| 3–1
|Bobby Escalante
|TKO (punches)
|UPC Unlimited 6
|
|align=center|1
|align=center|2:53
|Turlock, California, United States
|
|-
|Win
|align=center| 2–1
|Jordan Felix
|Submission (armbar)
|Gladiator Challenge - Warpath
|
|align=center|2
|align=center|1:04
|Placerville, California, United States
|
|-
|Win
|align=center| 1–1
|Ronald Carillo
|Decision (unanimous)
|CCFC - El Reventon
|
|align=center|3
|align=center|5:00
|Santa Rosa, California, United States
|
|-
|Loss
|align=center| 0–1
|Ulysses Gomez
|Submission (armbar)
|PFC 9: The Return
|
|align=center|1
|align=center|0:51
|Lemoore, California, United States
|
|-

See also
 List of current UFC fighters
 List of male mixed martial artists

References

External links
 
 

1986 births
American male mixed martial artists
Flyweight mixed martial artists
Living people
Mixed martial artists from California
Sportspeople from Michoacán
American mixed martial artists of Mexican descent
Mexican emigrants to the United States
People from Uruapan
People from Ukiah, California
Ultimate Fighting Championship male fighters